Erendira is a genus of corinnid sac spiders first described by A. B. Bonaldo in 2000.

Species
 it contains five species:
Erendira atrox (Caporiacco, 1955) — Venezuela
Erendira luteomaculata (Petrunkevitch, 1925) — Panama
Erendira pallidoguttata (Simon, 1898) — Puerto Rico, Lesser Antilles
Erendira pictithorax (Caporiacco, 1955) — Venezuela
Erendira subsignata (Simon, 1898) — St. Vincent

References

Araneomorphae genera
Corinnidae